Bolivia–Paraguay relations is the relationship between two South American states, Bolivia and Paraguay. Both nations are members of the Community of Latin American and Caribbean States, Organization of Ibero-American States, Organization of American States, and the United Nations.

History

Initially, both modern states of Bolivia and Paraguay were part of the Viceroyalty of the Río de la Plata. In 1932, both countries would break their diplomatic relations and enter into a disastrous war called the Chaco War, which would last 3 years, until 1935. This war caused serious economic, social and political consequences for both countries, thus delaying way its development. In 1938, a Peace Treaty was definitively signed between the two nations and the subsequent delimitation of borders.

Diplomatic missions
 Bolivia has an embassy in Asunción.
 Paraguay has an embassy in La Paz, a consulate-general in Santa Cruz de la Sierra and a consulate in Villamontes.

See also
 Chaco War
 Foreign relations of Bolivia
 Foreign relations of Paraguay

References

 
Paraguay
Bolivia